The following highways are numbered 303:

Canada
 New Brunswick Route 303
 Nova Scotia Route 303
 Prince Edward Island Route 303
 Quebec Route 303
 Saskatchewan Highway 303

China
 China National Highway 303

Costa Rica
 National Route 303

India
 National Highway 303 (India)

Japan
 Japan National Route 303

Philippines
 N303 highway (Philippines)

United Kingdom
  A303 road (Basingstoke-Honiton)

United States
  Arizona State Route 303
  Arkansas Highway 303
  Georgia State Route 303
  Indiana State Road 303
  Kentucky Route 303
  Louisiana Highway 303
  Maryland Route 303
  Minnesota State Highway 303 (former)
  New Jersey Route 303 (never built)
 New York:
  New York State Route 303
 County Route 303 (Albany County, New York)
  County Route 303 (Erie County, New York)
 County Route 303 (Westchester County, New York)
  North Carolina Highway 303 (former)
  Ohio State Route 303
  Pennsylvania Route 303 (former)
  South Carolina Highway 303
  Tennessee State Route 303
 Texas:
  Texas State Highway 303 (former)
  Texas State Highway Spur 303
  Farm to Market Road 303
  Urban Road 303 (signed as Farm to Market Road 303)
  Utah State Route 303
  Virginia State Route 303
  Washington State Route 303

Other areas:
  Puerto Rico Highway 303
  U.S. Virgin Islands Highway 303